is a Japanese rugby union player. Usuzuki has played seven tests for the Japan national rugby union team.
Usuzuki was a member of the Japan national rugby union team at the 2011 Rugby World Cup.

References

Living people
Japanese rugby union players
Asian Games medalists in rugby union
Rugby union players at the 2010 Asian Games
Toshiba Brave Lupus Tokyo players
Asian Games gold medalists for Japan
Medalists at the 2010 Asian Games
1985 births
Japan international rugby union players
Rugby union fullbacks